Arleux-en-Gohelle is a commune in the Pas-de-Calais department in northern France.

Geography
A village located 7 miles (12 km) north-east of Arras at the junction of the N919 and D50 roads.

History
The commune name first appears in 1119 as Haluth. The village was all but destroyed during World War I.

Population

Sights
 The church of St. Martin, dating from the twentieth century.
 The World War I cemetery.

See also
Communes of the Pas-de-Calais department

References

External links

 Commonwealth War Graves Commission - Arleux-en-Gohelle (Orchard Dump)

Communes of Pas-de-Calais